is a railway station on the Iida Line in the village of Tenryū, Shimoina, Nagano Prefecture, Japan, operated by Central Japan Railway Company (JR Central).

Lines
Nakaisamurai Station is served by the Iida Line and is 87.8 kilometers from the starting point of the line at Toyohashi Station.

Station layout
The station consists of a single ground-level side platform serving one bi-directional track. The station is unattended. There is no station building, but only a waiting room on the platform.

Adjacent stations

History
Nakaisamurai Station opened on 30 December 1936. With the privatization of Japanese National Railways (JNR) on 1 April 1987, the station came under the control of JR Central.

Passenger statistics
In fiscal 2016, the station was used by an average of 10 passengers daily (boarding passengers only).

Surrounding area
The station is in a rural area surrounded by tea fields, with no buildings nearby.

See also
 List of railway stations in Japan

References

External links

 Nakaisamurai Station information 

Railway stations in Nagano Prefecture
Railway stations in Japan opened in 1936
Stations of Central Japan Railway Company
Iida Line
Tenryū, Nagano